Skoutari (Greek: Σκουτάρι) may refer to:

Skoutari, Laconia, a village in the southwestern part of Laconia, Greece
Skoutari Bay, a bay on the east coast of the Mani Peninsula, Greece
Skoutari, Serres, a village in the Serres regional unit, Greece
Scutari (disambiguation), several places outside Greece formerly known by the name